Joseph Jefferson Fisher (April 16, 1910 – June 19, 2000) was a United States district judge of the United States District Court for the Eastern District of Texas.

Education and career
Born in Bland Lake, San Augustine County, Texas, Fisher received a Bachelor of Laws from the University of Texas School of Law in 1936. He was county attorney of San Augustine County from 1937 to 1939, and then district attorney of the First Judicial District of Texas from 1939 to 1946. He was in private practice in Jasper, Texas from 1946 to 1957. He was a Judge of the First Judicial District of Texas from 1957 to 1959.

Federal judicial service
On September 7, 1959, Fisher was nominated by President Dwight D. Eisenhower to a seat on the United States District Court for the Eastern District of Texas vacated by Judge Lamar John Ryan Cecil. Fisher was confirmed by the United States Senate on September 9, 1959, and received his commission on September 10, 1959. He served as Chief Judge from 1967 to 1980. He assumed senior status on January 30, 1984, and served in that capacity until his death on June 19, 2000 in Beaumont, Texas.

References

Sources
 

1910 births
2000 deaths
People from San Augustine County, Texas
Texas state court judges
Judges of the United States District Court for the Eastern District of Texas
United States district court judges appointed by Dwight D. Eisenhower
20th-century American judges
20th-century American lawyers
University of Texas School of Law alumni